The 2009 Emir of Qatar Cup was the 37th edition of a cup tournament in men's football (soccer). It is played by the 1st and 2nd Level divisions of the Qatari football league structure.

The top four sides of the 2008–09 Qatari League season enter at the quarter-final stage.

The winners of this knockout tournament should enter the AFC Champions League 2010 Asian club tournament, but due to Al-Gharafa winning the tournament, league runners up Al Sadd qualified.

Umm-Salal enter the tournament as the title holders.

Bracket

Fixtures and results

Round 1

8 teams play a knockout tie. 4 clubs advance to the next round. Ties played over 24 & 25 April 2009

Round 2
8 teams play a knockout tie. 4 clubs advance to the next round. Ties played over 29 & 30 April 2009

Quarter-finals
8 teams play a knockout tie. 4 clubs advance to the semi-finals. Ties played on 9 & 10 May 2009

Semi-finals
4 teams play a knockout tie. 2 clubs advance to the final. Ties played on 13 May 2009

 Al-Rayyan advance 4-2 on penalties

 Al-Gharafa advance 7-6 on penalties

Final

Football competitions in Qatar

fr:Coupe Crown Prince de Qatar
nl:Qatar Crown Prince Cup
ja:クラウンプリンスカップ (カタール)
ru:Кубок Наследного принца Катара